Chanterelle is a rural settlement in the Les Anglais commune of the Chardonnières Arrondissement, in the Sud department of Haiti.

See also
Boco
Dernere Morne
Les Anglais (town)
Limo

References

Populated places in Sud (department)